Luca Alonso Pontigo Marín (born 25 November 1994) is a Chilean footballer that currently plays for Primera B side Deportes Copiapó as a striker.

Career statistics

Honours
Deportes Santa Cruz
 Segunda División: 2018

Coquimbo Unido
 Primera B: 2021

References

External links
 

1987 births
Living people
Footballers from Santiago
Chilean footballers
Colo-Colo footballers
Colo-Colo B footballers
Magallanes footballers
Deportes Magallanes footballers
Rangers de Talca footballers
Deportes Iberia footballers
Independiente de Cauquenes footballers
Deportes Santa Cruz footballers
Deportes Copiapó footballers
Coquimbo Unido footballers
Chilean Primera División players
Segunda División Profesional de Chile players
Primera B de Chile players
Association football forwards